Göransson is a Swedish surname. It means "son of Göran" and was thus originally a patronymic. Notable people with the surname include:

André Göransson (born 1994), Swedish tennis player
Ann-Marie Göransson (born 1947), Swedish major general and surgeon
Bengt Göransson (1932–2021), Swedish politician
Bertil Göransson (1919–2004), Swedish rower who competed in the 1956 Summer Olympics
Curt Göransson (1909–1996), Swedish Army general
Göran Göransson (born 1956), Swedish former footballer and manager
Göran Fredrik Göransson (1819–1900), Swedish merchant, ironmaster and industrialist
Johan Göransson Gyllenstierna (1635–1680), Swedish statesman
Ludwig Göransson (born 1984), Swedish film composer
Richard Göransson (born 1978), Swedish auto racing driver
Rickard Göransson, Swedish musician
Sverker Göranson (born 1954), Swedish army general
Tim Göransson (born 1988), Swedish tennis player

You may also be looking for:

 Alicia "Lecy" Goranson, actress, played "Becky Conner" on Roseanne

Swedish-language surnames
Patronymic surnames
Surnames from given names